Peter Abimbola (born 22 February 2004) is an English professional footballer who plays as a midfielder for Aldershot Town, on loan from  club Northampton Town.

Career
Abimbola made his first-team debut for Northampton Town on 2 November 2021, in a 2–1 defeat to Brighton & Hove Albion U21 in an EFL Trophy match at Sixfields Stadium. He made his EFL League Two debut on 19 March 2022, in a 1–0 home defeat to Bristol Rovers. He signed his first professional contract in June 2022. On 12 November 2022, he joined Southern League Premier Division Central side AFC Rushden & Diamonds on a one-month loan.

On 13 January 2023, Abimbola joined National League side Aldershot Town on a one-month loan deal.

Career statistics

References

2004 births
Living people
English footballers
Association football midfielders
Northampton Town F.C. players
AFC Rushden & Diamonds players
Aldershot Town F.C. players
English Football League players
Southern Football League players
Black British sportsmen